Hanumanthanagar is a locality in Bannimantap, a suburb of Mysore coming on the Northern side of the city.  It is part of Mysore district in Karnataka state of India. Hanumanth Nagar is famous for the World famous Jumbo Savari with the golden Howdah a part of Mysore Dasara which marks an end of the procession in Bannimantap via Highway Circle of Hanumanth Nagar. Hanumanth Nagar is famous for high-end multicuisine restaurants like Eats of Arabs, Blue Inn, Hotel Rio Meridian and the star rated  Hotel Grand Mercure built and owned by the Brigade Group.

Etymology
The name comes from Sri Veeranjaneyaswamy Temple in the aea

Landmarks
 Highway Circle
 Hotel Grand Mercure
 Nalapad Residency
 Bannimantap Parade Grounds
 Karnataka Gramin Bank (formerly known as Kaveri Grameena Bank)
 Iqbal Packaging Industries

Transportation
From the Mysore city bus stand to Hanumanthanagar buses are available.

Nearby bus stops at HUDCO Layout.

See also 
 Bannimantap Parade Grounds
Naidu Nagar
Hebbal
Hale Kesare
Mandi Mohalla

References

Mysore North
Suburbs of Mysore